Mihajlo Baić (born 21 November 2002) is a Serbian footballer who plays as a forward for Osijek II.

Career statistics

Club

References

2002 births
Living people
Sportspeople from Subotica
Serbian footballers
Serbia youth international footballers
Association football forwards
FK Čukarički players
Red Star Belgrade footballers
FK Spartak Subotica players
NK Osijek players
NŠ Mura players
Serbian SuperLiga players
First Football League (Croatia) players
Slovenian PrvaLiga players
Serbian expatriate footballers
Serbian expatriate sportspeople in Croatia
Expatriate footballers in Croatia
Serbian expatriate sportspeople in Slovenia
Expatriate footballers in Slovenia